Kirchner, a surname of German origin, from the Middle High German word, 'kirchenaere' (English: 'sexton'). Kirchner originated as an occupational surname for a church worker, such as a priest, church assistant or a church property administrator. Notable people with the name include:

Arts
 Alfred Kirchner (born 1937), German actor, theatre director, opera director, theatre manager
 Ernst Ludwig Kirchner (1880–1938), German Expressionist artist
 Ignaz Kirchner (1946–2018), German actor
 Jaime Lee Kirchner (1981), American actress
 Leon Kirchner (1919-2009), American composer
 Marilena Kirchner (1997), German volksmusik and  schlager singer
 Paul Kirchner (1952), American illustrator and comic-book author
 Raphael Kirchner (1876–1917), Austrian artist and illustrator
 Shabier Kirchner (born 1987/1988), Antiguan cinematographer and filmmaker
 Theodor Kirchner (1823–1903), German composer
 Volker David Kirchner (1942–2020), German violist and composer

Politics
 Alicia Kirchner (born 1946), Argentine politician
 Cristina Fernández de Kirchner (born 1953), Vice President of Argentina
 Máximo Kirchner (born 1977), Argentine politician
 Néstor Kirchner (1950–2010), former President of Argentina
 William G. Kirchner (1916–1999), American politician and businessman

Sports
 Albert Edward Lester "Alby" Kirchner (1888–1942), Australian rules footballer
 Andreas Kirchner (1953-2010), German hammer thrower and bob pusher
 H. E. Kirchner (1937–1993), American basketball player
 Mark Kirchner (1970), German biathlete
 Michael Kirchner or Corporal Kirchner (1957–2021), American professional wrestler
 Zane Kirchner (1984), South African rugby player

Other
 16441 Kirchner, asteroid discovered in 1989
 Friedrich Kirchner (1885–1960), German General during the Second World War
 James Kirchner, University of California professor
 Johanna Kirchner (1889–1944), anti-Nazi dissident
 Kirchner's viscacha rat, species of rodents in the family Octodontidae described in 2014, one of two species in the genus Tympanoctomys
 Kirchner Cultural Centre, cultural centre located in Buenos Aires, Argentina
 Kirchneriella, genus of green algae in the family Selenastraceae
 Kirchner Peak, isolated peak in Antarctica
 Kirchnerism, Argentine political movement
 Kirchner v. Venus (1859), English Law case precedent that defined freight as "the reward payable to the carrier of for the safe carriage and delivery of goods"
 Oskar von Kirchner (1851–1925), German botanist and agronomist

See also
 Athanasius Kircher (sometimes spelled Kirchner), 17th century German scholar

References

German-language surnames
Occupational surnames